The Fellowship League is a high school athletic league that is part of the CIF Southern Section. It does not sponsor football.

Schools
Schools for the 2014–15 basketball season are:
 Waldorf School of Orange County
 Christbridge Academy
 Carson Christian School
 Arroyo Pacific Academy
 Harvest Christian Academy
 Gateway Christian Academy
 Orange County Christian School
 New Life Christian School

References

CIF Southern Section leagues